The women's 100 metres hurdles event at the 1986 World Junior Championships in Athletics was held in Athens, Greece, at Olympic Stadium on 17 and 18 July.

Medalists

Results

Final
18 July
Wind: -0.8 m/s

Semifinals
18 July

Semifinal 1

Wind: -0.3 m/s

Semifinal 2

Wind: +1.1 m/s

Heats
17 July

Heat 1

Wind: +0.4 m/s

Heat 2

Wind: -1.9 m/s

Heat 3

Wind: +1.3 m/s

Heat 4

Wind: +0.3 m/s

Participation
According to an unofficial count, 29 athletes from 22 countries participated in the event.

References

100 metres hurdles
Sprint hurdles at the World Athletics U20 Championships